7aam Uyir is a 2015 Tamil-language thriller soap opera starring Lakshmi, Suzane, Sowpna, Azhagar and Sarath. It aired Monday through Friday on Vendhar TV from 1 June 2015 to 31 March 2016 at 7:00PM and 9:00PM (IST) for 210 episodes. It was directed by Azhagar.

Plot
It is the story of seven young girls who are about to be haunted by some unknown spirit.

Cast

Main Cast

 Suzane
 Sowpna
 Lakshmi

Supporting Cast

 Azhagar
 Venkadesh
 Sarath
 Manikkarajan
 Murugan
 Supramani
 Ravi
 Jeeva
 Deepa
 Aiyappan
 Stylin Varnaa
 Indhu
 Sri Vithiya Nayar
 Sharmi
 Suresh
 Ramnath

International broadcast
The series was released on 1 June 2015 on Vendhar TV. The show was also broadcast internationally on the channel's international distribution. It aired in Australia, United States, Europe and Canada on Athavan TV and also aired in Singapore and Malaysia on Astro Vinmeen HD. The show's episodes were released on the Vendhar TV YouTube channel.

References

External links
 Vendhar TV Website 
 Vendhar TV on YouTube

Vendhar TV television series
Tamil-language horror fiction television series
Tamil-language thriller television series
2015 Tamil-language television series debuts
Tamil-language television soap operas
2016 Tamil-language television series endings
Tamil-language television shows